The Travel Corporation is an international, privately owned hotel and travel company based in Cypress, California and Bermuda. Its businesses including Contiki, Uniworld and Red Carnation Hotels hosted two million travellers in 2019.

History

The company traces its history to a small hotel outside Cape Town, South Africa, in the early 1900s.

Operations

 The Travel Corporation owns owns tour operators and travel agents including:
 AAT Kings 
 Aussie Adventure 
 Inspiring Journeys
 Adventure World Travel
 African Travel
 Brendan Vacations
 Contiki Tours
 Down Under Tours
 Evan Evans Tours
 Grand European Travel
 HAGGiS Adventures
 Highland Explorer Tours
 Shamrocker Adventures
 Insight Vacations
 Luxury Gold
 Lion World Travel
 Siva Travel Services Greece
 Trafalgar Tours
 Costsaver
 Travel Corporation Asia
 Uniworld
 Atlas Reizen

Its Red Carnation Hotels operates in the United Kingdom, Ireland, United States, South Africa, Botswana, Guernsey and Switzerland.

Other activities include Florida's Old Town amusement park, Bouchard Finlayson Winery in South Africa and a shareholding in, the also South African, Cullinan Holdings Ltd travel and tourism business.

TreadRight Foundation

The Travel Corporation's not-for-profit TreadRight Foundation was established in 2008, and  has contributed over US$2.5 million to sustainable tourism projects.

Awards

In August 2015, Red Carnation Hotels' Ashford Castle in Ireland was voted world's best hotel by Virtuoso Travel Week, and third best world hotel in July 2015 by Travel + Leisure magazine.

References

External links
 

Companies based in Orange County, California
Companies established in 1920
Cypress, California
Travel and holiday companies of the United States